The 2009 Cork Premier Intermediate Football Championship was the fourth staging of the Cork Premier Intermediate Football Championship since its establishment by the Cork County Board in 2006. The draw for the opening round fixtures took place on 13 December 2008. The championship began on 1 April 2009 and ended on 18 October 2009.

St. Finbarr's and Youghal left the championship after their respective promotion and relegation to different grades. Bantry Blues and Valley Rovers joined the championship. Killavullen were relegated from the championship after being beaten in a playoff by Mayfield.

The final was played on 18 October 2009 at Páirc Uí Chaoimh in Cork, between Valley Rovers and Clyda Rovers. Valley Rovers won the final by 0-07 to 0-05 to claim their first championship title in the grade and a second successive promotion.

Glanmire's James Murphy was the championship's top scorer with 2-25.

Team changes

To Championship

Promoted from the Cork Intermediate Football Championship
 Valley Rovers

Relegated from the Cork Senior Football Championship
 Bantry Blues

From Championship

Promoted to the Cork Senior Football Championship
 St. Finbarr's

Relegated to the Cork Intermediate Football Championship
 Youghal

Results

Round 1

Round 2

Relegation play-offs

Round 3

Quartier-finals

Semi-finals

Finals

Championship statistics

Top scorers

Overall

In a single game

References

External link

2009 Cork PIFC results

Cork Premier Intermediate Football Championship